Stegodontidae is an extinct family of proboscideans from Africa and Asia (with a single occurrence in Europe) from the Miocene (15.97 mya) to the Late Pleistocene, with some studies suggesting that some survived into the Holocene in China (until as recently as 4.1 thousand years ago), although this is disputed. It contains two genera, the earlier Stegolophodon, known from the Early Miocene of Asia and the later Stegodon, from the Late Miocene to Late Pleistocene of Africa and Asia (with a single occurrence in Greece)  which derived from the former. The group is noted for their plate-like lophs on their teeth, which are similar to elephants and different from those than of other extinct proboscideans like gomphotheres and mastodons. This similarity with modern elephants may have been convergently evolved, however.

Taxonomy
Stegodontidae was named by Osborn (1918). It was assigned to Mammutoidea by Carroll (1988); to Elephantoidea by Lambert and Shoshani (1998); and to Elephantoidea by Shoshani et al. (2006). It contains two of extinct elephant-like genera:

Like all proboscideans, the clade's position is uncertain: Some authors place it as a daughter clade under the Elephantidae, while others make the Stegodontidae a sister-clade to the Elephantidae.

References

 
Miocene proboscideans
Pleistocene proboscideans
Pliocene proboscideans
Cenozoic mammals of Africa
Cenozoic mammals of Asia
Pleistocene extinctions
Miocene first appearances
Prehistoric mammal families